Anna Maria Ballantyne "Annie" Taylor Hyde (October 21, 1849 – March 12, 1909) was the founder and first president of the Daughters of Utah Pioneers and was a women's leader in the Church of Jesus Christ of Latter-day Saints (LDS Church).

Anna Maria Ballantyne Taylor was born in a Mormon pioneer wagon shortly after her parents, LDS Church apostle John Taylor and Jane Ballantyne, had arrived in the Salt Lake Valley. Taylor's mother, Jane Ballantyne Taylor, was a sister of Richard Ballantyne, the founder of the LDS Sunday School. Taylor was educated at the University of Deseret. In December 1870, she married Alonzo Eugene Hyde, a son of Orson Hyde, in the Endowment House in Salt Lake City.

On April 11, 1901, she invited 54 other women to join her in creating Daughters of the Utah Pioneers, an organization that would "perpetuate the names and achievements of the men, women and children who were the pioneers in founding this commonwealth [Utah]". Hyde was elected the first president of the organization, and she held this position until her death.

Later in 1901, Hyde was asked by Bathsheba W. Smith to become her first counselor in the general presidency of the Relief Society, the LDS Church organization of women. Hyde also served in this capacity until her death. As a member of the Relief Society general presidency, Hyde represented the Relief Society at meetings of the National Council of Women.

Annie Taylor Hyde and her husband were the parents of eight children. One of their daughters, Annie Laura Hyde, married Joseph F. Merrill, who later became an apostle in the LDS Church.

Annie Taylor Hyde died in Salt Lake City from stomach cancer, aged 59.

See also
Maria Young Dougall

Notes

References
"The Daughters of Utah Pioneers", in Kate B. Carter (ed.) (1939–1951). Heart Throbs of the West (Salt Lake City, Utah: Daughters of the Utah Pioneers), vol. 11, pp. 329–428
Jill Mulvay Derr, Janath Russell Cannon, and Maureen Ursenbach Beecher (2002). Women of Covenant: The Story of Relief Society (Salt Lake City, Utah: Deseret Book)
Richard L. Jensen, "The John Taylor Family," Ensign, February 1980, pp. 50–51

External links

Annie T. Hyde letter, Brigham Young University, Harold B. Lee Library, L. Tom Perry Special Collections

1849 births
1909 deaths
American leaders of the Church of Jesus Christ of Latter-day Saints
Burials at Salt Lake City Cemetery
Deaths from cancer in Utah
Counselors in the General Presidency of the Relief Society
Deaths from stomach cancer
People from Salt Lake City
Presidents of Daughters of Utah Pioneers
University of Utah alumni
Founders of lineage societies
Latter Day Saints from Utah
Taylor family (Latter Day Saints)